The Académie Moderne was a free art school in Paris. It was founded by Fernand Léger and Amédée Ozenfant in 1924. The school attracted students from Europe and America. Both Léger and Ozenfant taught there, along with Aleksandra Ekster and Marie Laurencin.

References

Art schools in Paris
1924 establishments in France
Educational institutions established in 1924